Andi Langenhan (born 1 October 1984) is a German luger who has been competing since 1995 and has been on the German national team since 2001. He won two bronze medals in the men's singles event at the FIL World Luge Championships (2008, 2011).

Langenhan qualified for the 2010 Winter Olympics where he finished fifth.

References

External links
 
 
 
 

1984 births
Living people
People from Suhl
German male lugers
Sportspeople from Thuringia
Olympic lugers of Germany
Lugers at the 2010 Winter Olympics
Lugers at the 2014 Winter Olympics
Lugers at the 2018 Winter Olympics